Gul Ahmed Textile Mills Limited is a Pakistani textile company which manufactures and sells clothing through a chain of retail outlets under the name 'Ideas by Gul Ahmed'.

History
Gul Ahmed began trading in textiles in the early 20th century.

In 1953, the group decided to enter the field of manufacturing under the name Gul Ahmed Textile Mills Limited, and was incorporated as a privately limited company. 

In 1970, it was listed on the Karachi Stock Exchange, and was one of the leading composite textile houses in Pakistan.

In 2003, Gul Ahmed expanded to the retail sector and founded Ideas by Gul Ahmed retail chain. It offers a range of home textiles and furnishings for the bedroom, kitchen and bathroom, as well as men's and women's apparel. It also provides in-house monogramming, embroidery and tailor-made services.

References

External links
 Gul Ahmed official site, company overview

Clothing retailers of Pakistan
Manufacturing companies of Pakistan
Clothing brands of Pakistan
1953 establishments in Pakistan
Clothing companies of Pakistan
Companies listed on the Pakistan Stock Exchange